The 1986–87 Ohio Bobcats men's basketball team represented Ohio University as a member of the Mid-American Conference in the college basketball season of 1986–87. The team was coached by Billy Hahn in his first season at Ohio. They played their home games at Convocation Center. The Bobcats finished with a record of 14–14 and finished sixth in MAC regular season with a conference record of 7–9.

Schedule

|-
!colspan=9 style=|Non-conference regular season

|-
!colspan=9 style=| MAC Tournament

Source:

Statistics

Team Statistics
Final 1986–87 Statistics

Source

Player statistics

Source

References

Ohio Bobcats men's basketball seasons
Ohio
Ohio Bobcats men's basketball
Ohio Bobcats men's basketball